Moshe Levy (born 1952) is an Israeli paralympic champion.

Levy was born in Israel in 1952 and contracted polio as a young baby. In 1962 he began practicing at the Israel Sports Center for the Disabled, focusing on swimming and wheelchair basketball. That same year he attended for the first time the competition for swimming across the Sea of Galilee, in which he later took part for 13 consecutive years.

Over the years Levy participated in various international competitions, including seven Paralympic Games. He won 6 paralympic medals as an individual and others as a member of the Israeli wheelchair basketball team.

In later years Levy remains active in sports and plays at "Kessem" basketball team, operated by an organization for promotion of paralympic sports. In 2003 - 2004 he coached his team.

He married paralympic athelete Chemda Levy.

References

External links
 

Living people
1952 births
Israeli male swimmers
Israeli men's wheelchair basketball players
Israeli basketball coaches
Paralympic swimmers of Israel
Paralympic wheelchair basketball players of Israel
Swimmers at the 1968 Summer Paralympics
Swimmers at the 1972 Summer Paralympics
Swimmers at the 1976 Summer Paralympics
Paralympic gold medalists for Israel
Paralympic silver medalists for Israel
Paralympic bronze medalists for Israel
Wheelchair category Paralympic competitors
Medalists at the 1968 Summer Paralympics
Medalists at the 1972 Summer Paralympics
Medalists at the 1976 Summer Paralympics
Medalists at the 1980 Summer Paralympics
Wheelchair basketball players at the 1980 Summer Paralympics
Paralympic medalists in wheelchair basketball
Paralympic medalists in swimming